Zargar may refer to:

Zərgər, Azerbaijan
Zargar, Ardabil, Iran
Zargar-e Goli Bolaghi, Ardabil Province, Iran
Zargar, East Azerbaijan, Iran
Zargar-e Olya, Kerman Province, Iran
Zargar, Semnan, Iran
Zargar, South Khorasan, Iran
Zargar, Qazvin, Iran